B. Mohan Reddy is an Indian politician and academic. He is a Member of Legislative Council in Andhra Pradesh. He belongs to Indian National Congress. He is president of Telangana Teachers' Association and is also associated with Progressive Recognised Teachers Union (PRTU).

References

Indian National Congress politicians from Andhra Pradesh
Living people
Year of birth missing (living people)